Makhabbat Umutzhanova (born 11 August 1994) is a Kazakhstani racing cyclist, who most recently rode for Emirati amateur team Dubai Police.

Major results
Source: 

2015
 2nd Road race, National Road Championships
2016
 3rd Time trial, National Road Championships
2017
 3rd Time trial, National Road Championships
 4th Road race, Asian Road Championships
 9th Horizon Park Women Challenge
2018
 3rd Road race, National Road Championships
2019
 1st  Time trial, National Road Championships
 2nd  Team time trial, Asian Road Championships
2021
 1st  Road race, National Road Championships
2022
 1st  Time trial, National Road Championships
 Asian Road Championships
2nd  Road race
2nd  Team time trial
 9th Grand Prix Gazipaşa

See also
 List of 2016 UCI Women's Teams and riders

References

External links
 

1994 births
Living people
Kazakhstani female cyclists
People from Petropavl
20th-century Kazakhstani women
21st-century Kazakhstani women